Doug Eckerty (born 1954) is an American politician who served as a member of the Indiana Senate for the 26th district from 2010 to 2018. He is a member of the Citizens of Delaware County for Property Tax Repeal. In 2017, Eckerty announced that he would not seek re-election to the Senate. He was succeeded by fellow Republican Mike Gaskill.

References

External links
Virtual Office of Senator Doug Eckerty official Indiana State Legislature site
 

1954 births
Living people
Republican Party Indiana state senators
21st-century American politicians